MacCarthy Island, also known as Lemain Island or Janjanbureh Island, is an island located approximately 170 miles (272 km) upriver from the mouth of the Gambia River, in eastern Gambia, in the Janjanbureh District. Located on the island is the second-largest town in the country, Janjanbureh, but on many maps it still appears by its European name of Georgetown. In addition to being a destination for some wildlife tourists, the island is also the home of Gambia's largest prison.

History 

The island was first settled by Western traders in the 15th century, although by the 19th century it was no longer a viable trading post due to frequent wars between the Wulli and Niani tribes. The island was subsequently purchased by the British to use as a military garrison to help protect the traders. A treaty of cession was signed in 1823 and the island was formally named MacCarthy Island (after Sir Charles MacCarthy, former Governor General of the British West African Territories.) In 1832, Georgetown was founded by the British as a Creole settlement, although it was quickly populated by liberated Africans from elsewhere. The town gradually became an administrative and economic centre for the country.

References

External links 
 Tours to Janjanbureh Island
 Information from "Slavery Trade of the Gambia"

Janjanbureh
Gambia River
Central River Division
River islands of the Gambia